Alcaligenes is a genus of Gram-negative, aerobic, rod-shaped bacteria. The species are motile with amphitrichous flagella and rarely nonmotile. It is a genus of non-fermenting bacteria (in the family Alcaligenaceae). Additionally, some strains of Alcaligenes are capable of anaerobic respiration, but they must be in the presence of nitrate or nitrite; otherwise, their metabolism is respiratory and never fermentative. Strains of Alcaligenes (such as A. faecalis) are found mostly in the intestinal tracts of vertebrates, decaying materials, dairy products, water, and soil; they can be isolated from human respiratory and gastrointestinal tracts and wounds in hospitalized patients with compromised immune systems. They are occasionally the cause of opportunistic infections, including nosocomial sepsis.

Alcaligenes faecalis causes nosocomial sepsis, arising from contaminated hemodialysis or intravenous fluid, in immunocompromised patients.

Alcaligenes species have been used for the industrial production of nonstandard amino acids; A. eutrophus also produces the biopolymer polyhydroxybutyrate.

They are rods, coccal rods, or cocci, sized at about 0.5-1.0 x 0.5-2.6 μm. They are obligately aerobic, but some can undergo anaerobic respiration if nitrate is present. They tend to be colorless. They typically occur in the soil and water, and some live in the intestinal tracts of vertebrates. Samples from blood, urine, feces, discharge from ears, spinal fluid, and wounds have produced this type of bacteria. Zoonotic infections from ferrets have been recorded.

Alcaligenes species have been increasingly recovered over the past decade from patients with cystic fibrosis (CF). An experiment recently examined the frequency of correct identification of Alcaligenes species by microbiology labs affiliated with American CF patient care centers. Most (89%) strains of microbial agents in these tests were correctly identified by the referring laboratories as Alcaligenes xylosoxidans.

A. faecalis was isolated in 1896 by Petruschky from stale beer. Several strains of the organism have been found since then. This species is motile, flagellated, slender, slightly curved, not spore-forming, slowly growing, nonfermenting, capsule forming, Gram-negative aerobe of the family Alcaligenaceae. This species is most commonly found in the alimentary tract as a harmless saprophyte in 5% – 19% of the normal population. Systemic infection with this organism is very uncommon. It has been reported to cause sepsis, meningitis, peritonitis, enteric fever, appendicitis, cystitis, chronic suppurative otitis media, abscesses, arthritis, pneumonitis, and endocarditis. It has been associated with fatal outcomes because these organisms are resistant to commonly used antibiotics.

The name Alcaligenes has its origin in Arabic and Greek and means "alkali-producing". It was named in 1919.

References

External links
 Alcaligenes at Kenyon College.

Burkholderiales
Bacteria genera